The Guineas Meeting is the British flat racing event that takes place at Newmarket Racecourse at the beginning of May each year. It includes two British Classic Races:

The 1,000 Guineas, a mile race for three year old fillies
The 2,000 Guineas, a mile race for three year old colts and fillies

Both races are part of the British Champions Series.

Horse racing meetings in Great Britain
Newmarket Racecourse
British Champions Series